Anyuan District is a district of the city of Pingxiang, Jiangxi province, People's Republic of China.

The famous Maoist propaganda painting Chairman Mao Goes to Anyuan is set in this location, depicting an occasion when the young Mao Zedong traveled to Anyuan to help lead a miners' strike. The 1962 painting "Comrade Liu Shaoqi and the Anyuan Miners" portrays the same strike.

Administrative divisions
Anyuan District has 6 Subdistricts and 4 towns.

6 Subdistricts

4 towns

Climate

Notes

External links 

  Government site - 

Anyuan